Heroiske may refer to the following places in Ukraine:

 Heroiske, Crimea, village in Saky Raion
 Heroiske, Kherson Oblast, village in Skadovsk Raion